The Stacey Hotel, at Broadway and College Sts. in Jackson, Kentucky, was built during 1914 to 1920.  It was listed on the National Register of Historic Places in 1986.

It was a three-story, six-bay brick commercial building with a cast iron first floor facade.  It had rounded arched windows with brick
corbelling.

The building appears to have been destroyed or moved.

References

Hotel buildings on the National Register of Historic Places in Kentucky
Hotel buildings completed in 1920
National Register of Historic Places in Breathitt County, Kentucky
1920 establishments in Kentucky
Former buildings and structures in Kentucky